"Tear Time" is a 1967 single by Wilma Burgess.  "Tear Time" was Wilma Burgess' fifth country hit. The single spent a total of sixteen weeks on the Billboard country chart peaking at number fifteen.

Chart performance

Dave & Sugar version

In 1978, Dave & Sugar had their second number one on the country chart with their version of the song.

Chart performance

References
 

1967 singles
1978 singles
Wilma Burgess songs
Dave & Sugar songs
RCA Records singles
1967 songs
Songs written by Jan Crutchfield